Robert Grosvenor Gardner (November 5, 1925 – June 21, 2014) was an American academic, anthropologist, and documentary filmmaker who was the Director of the Film Study Center at Harvard University from 1956 to 1997. He is known for his work in the field of visual anthropology and films like the National Film Registry inductee Dead Birds and Forest of Bliss. In 2011, a retrospective of his work was held at Film Forum, New York.

Biography
He was the sixth child and third son, born in the home of his grandmother Isabella Stewart Gardner. He was a cousin of poet Robert Lowell.

After graduating with a Bachelor of Arts degree from Harvard University in 1947, he became an assistant to the founder of the Byzantine Institute of America, Thomas Whittemore at Harvard's Fogg Museum. This led to travels to Anatolia, Fayum and London working with Coptic textiles and restoring Byzantine art Next, he started teaching  medieval art and history at the College of Puget Sound in Washington state. Here, he took to writings of anthropologist Ruth Benedict and he ended up post doing MA in anthropology from Harvard. It was during his graduation period that he took part in an expedition on Kalahari Desert Bushmen, for which he took photographs, films and carried out elementary research work. Thereafter he founded The Film Study Center, a  production and research unit at the Peabody Museum at Harvard in 1957 where it made documentary films till he left the centre in 1997.

He lived in Cambridge, MA with wife, Adele Pressman, a psychiatrist, and two children, Caleb and Noah Gardner. He has three other children from his first marriage to Ainslie Anderson: Stewart, Eve, and Luke..

The Peabody Museum of Archaeology and Ethnology now gives the Harvard University's 'Robert Gardner Fellowship in Photography' worth $US50,000

Screening Room
Gardner also hosted a Boston television series during the 1970s-early 1980s on an ABC affiliate showcasing works by independent filmmakers ranging from animation (Caroline Leaf, John and Faith Hubley), experimental (Hollis Frampton, Standish Lawder) and documentary film (Les Blank, Hilary Harris).

Filmography
 Blunden Harbour (1951)
 Dances of the Kwakiutl (1951)
 Mark Tobey (1952)
 The Hunters (1957)
 Dead Birds (1963)
 Marathon (1964)
 The Nuer (1971)
 Mark Tobey Abroad (1973)
 Rivers of Sand (1973)
 Altar of Fire (1976)
 Deep Hearts (1981)
 Sons of Shiva (1985)
 Forest of Bliss (1986)
 Ika Hands (1988)
 Dancing With Miklos (1993)
 Passenger (1998)
 Scully in Malaga (1998)
 Good to Pull (Bon a Tirer) (2000)

Related filmmakers
Tim Asch
John Marshall

Bibliography
 Gardner, Robert. 2006. The Impulse to Preserve: Reflections of a Filmmaker. Other Press.
 The Cinema of Robert Gardner, by Ilisa Barbash, Lucien Taylor. Berg, 2007. .
 Harry Tomicek. 1991 Gardner Oesterreichisches Filmuseum. (In German)

References

Further reading
 Robert Gardner Profile at  The Film Study Center at Harvard University
 An Anthropological Critique Of The Films Of Robert Gardner at Temple University
Ruby, Jay. Picturing Culture: Explorations of Film and Anthropology. Chicago: U. of Chicago Press, 2000.
Heider, Karl. Ethnographic Film. Austin: University of Texas Press, 1978.
Schmitz M. Norbert, Gupta, Susanne. "Robert Gardners "Forest of Bliss" - Dokumentarfilm als visuelle Poesie, UVK Konstanz, 2012.

External links
 Robert Gardner website
 Robert Gardner at Harvard
 Revue Independencia

 

1925 births
2014 deaths
American anthropologists
Cultural anthropologists
Harvard University faculty
People from Brookline, Massachusetts
People from Cambridge, Massachusetts
Visual anthropologists
American documentary filmmakers
Harvard University alumni
University of Puget Sound faculty